The Translational Genomics Research Institute (TGen) is a non-profit genomics research institute based in Arizona, United States.

History and activities 
TGen was established in 2002 by Jeffrey Trent in Phoenix, Arizona, United States.  The Institute began with a  investment from Arizona public and private-sector investors.

TGen conducts research on a number of human disorders including Alzheimer's disease, autism, Parkinson's, diabetes, and numerous forms of cancer and a variety of other complex human diseases.  The institute has helped to generate a strong foundation for Arizona's growing role in scientific research and cutting edge biotechnology.

The emerging field of translational genomics research searches for ways to apply results from the Human Genome Project to the development of improved diagnostics, prognostics, and therapies for cancer, neurological disorders, diabetes and other complex diseases.

TGen Administration
 Jeffrey M. Trent, Ph.D., President & Scientific Director
 Sunil Sharma, MD FACP, Deputy Director
 Michael Bassoff, President, TGen Foundation
 Daniel Von Hoff, M.D., F.A.C.P., Executive Vice President, Physician-in-Chief
 Tess Burleson, MBA, CPA, Chief Operating Officer and President, TGen Accelerators
 Chuck Coleson, Chief Financial Officer
 Galen Perry, Vice President, Marketing and Communications
 Brady Young, Vice President, Human Resources
 Kendall Van Keuren-Jensen, co-Director

References

External links 
 

Genetics or genomics research institutions
Bioinformatics organizations
Research institutes in Arizona
Research institutes established in 2002
Organizations based in Arizona
2002 establishments in Arizona